Thyreopterus is a genus of beetles in the family Carabidae, containing the following species:

 Thyreopterus angusticollis Peringuey, 1904 
 Thyreopterus ardoini (Basilewsky, 1961) 
 Thyreopterus bifasciatus Hope, 1842 
 Thyreopterus bilunatus Burgeon, 1933 
 Thyreopterus caliginosus (Basilewsky, 1957) 
 Thyreopterus chirindanus Basilewsky, 1955 
 Thyreopterus collarti (Alluaud, 1932) 
 Thyreopterus decellei (Basilewsky, 1963)  
 Thyreopterus effugiens Basilewsky, 1968 
 Thyreopterus flavosignatus Dejean, 1831 
 Thyreopterus kaboboanus Basilewsky, 1960 
 Thyreopterus kivuanus Basilewsky, 1960  
 Thyreopterus latipennis (Alluaud, 1932) 
 Thyreopterus lepesmei Burgeon, 1942 
 Thyreopterus letestui Alluaud, 1932 
 Thyreopterus limbatus Boheman, 1848 
 Thyreopterus lusingae (Basilewsky, 1953) 
 Thyreopterus luteicornis Chaudoir, 1869 
 Thyreopterus maculatus Chaudoir, 1837 
 Thyreopterus mediomaculatus (Burgeon, 1933) 
 Thyreopterus orbicollis Burgeon, 1942 
 Thyreopterus overlaeti Burgeon, 1937  
 Thyreopterus plesius (Alluaud, 1932) 
 Thyreopterus posticalis Alluaud, 1932 
 Thyreopterus ptolemaei (Alluaud, 1917) 
 Thyreopterus quadrilunatus Burgeon, 1933 
 Thyreopterus rugicollis (Basilewsky, 1951) 
 Thyreopterus spinipennis Alluaud, 1916 
 Thyreopterus uelensis Burgeon, 1937 
 Thyreopterus undulatus Dejean, 1831 
 Thyreopterus vaneyeni (Basilewsky, 1949)

References

Lebiinae